Guo Degang is a Chinese crosstalk (xiangsheng) comedian and actor. Guo's film appearances include The 601st Phone Call, Just Another Pandora's Box, and Mystery. Guo has also directed the films Our Happiness and The Faces of My Gene.

Biography
Guo Degang was born on January 18, 1973, in Tianjin, China. Guo began his acting studies by studying Pingshu from Gao Qinghai, crosstalk from Chang Baofeng and Hou Yaowen, and opera, including Peking opera, Ping opera, and Hebei Clapper opera. In 1996 Guo founded the crosstalk group "De Yun She" in Beijing, which subsequently collaborated with Zhang Wenshun and Yu Qian in 2000 and Yu Qian, Zhang Yongyong, Wang Shiyong, and Yang Jinming in 2002. In 2005 Guo and other crosstalk actors formed the Deyun Crosstalk Association to raise public awareness of crosstalk. Guo subsequently acted in special crosstalk shows at the PLA Theater and the Tianjin People's Stadium in 2006 and at the Great Hall of the People in 2008. In 2010 Guo hosted the There is a Play Tonight talk show. In 2012 he starred in the movie The Unfortunate Car, for which he won The Most Outstanding Asian Artists and 7th Tripod awards for Best Artistic Actor in China. The next year Guo was featured in the CCTV New Year's Gala and hosted the talk show Good Show on Jiangsu Satellite TV. In 2014 Guo starred in Just Another Margin and Mystery and served as an instructor for the Comedy Show television show. The next year he directed and starred in the film Our Happiness and hosted the talk show Gang’s Coming. In 2016 Guo participated in the opening ceremony of “The 20th Anniversary of Deyun Crosstalk Association” and began working as a comedian observer for Top Funny Comedian on Dragon TV. In 2017 Guo directed The Faces of My Gene, which premiered in China on February 16, 2018, grossing $100 million at the box office.

Personal life
Guo had a son, Guo Qilin (郭麒麟), with his first wife, Hu Zhonghui, in 1996. After receiving a divorce, Guo remarried to his current wife Wang Hui (王惠), with whom he had a second son on January 5, 2015.

Filmography

Film
 The 601st Phone Call (2006)
 Getting Home (2007)
 The Founding of a Republic (2009)
 Mars Baby (2009)
 Eaters (2009)
 Just Another Pandora's Box (2010)
 The Love of Three Smile: Scholar and the Beauty (2010)
 The Warring States (2011)
 Marry a Perfect Man (2012)
 The Unfortunate Car (2012)
 Just Another Margin (2014)
 Mystery (2014)
 Revenge for Love (2017)
 Top Funny Comedian: The Movie (2017)
 The Faces of My Gene (2018)

Television
 Dreaming Tang Dynasty (2012)
 Great Family 1912 (2012)
 King Rouge (2013)

Awards

As host

As actor

References

External links
 
 Official website

1973 births
Living people
Chinese male stage actors
Chinese xiangsheng performers
Male actors from Tianjin
Chinese male film actors
Chinese male television actors